Arthur Frans Allemeersch (born 27 July 2001) is a Belgian professional footballer who plays as a forward for Eerste Divisie club TOP Oss.

Career
Allemeersch played his first match on 23 August 2019 in a Belgian Cup match against Wetteren, scoring once in a 6–0 win. One week later he was subbed on again in an away win at Lokeren.

On 20 June 2022, Allemeersch joined Eerste Divisie club TOP Oss.

References

2001 births
Living people
Association football forwards
Belgian footballers
Oud-Heverlee Leuven players
TOP Oss players
Belgian Pro League players
Challenger Pro League players
Eerste Divisie players
Expatriate footballers in the Netherlands
Belgian expatriate sportspeople in the Netherlands
Footballers from Flemish Brabant